Banderas River is a river located in the southern part of the Ahuachapán Department of El Salvador.  Precipitations along the river are suitable for municipal water, irrigation, and water wells.

References

Ahuachapán Department
Rivers of El Salvador